The 1994 Grand Prix de Tennis de Toulouse was a men's tennis tournament played on indoor hard courts in Toulouse, France that was part of the World Series of the 1994 ATP Tour. It was the thirteenth edition of the tournament and was held from 3 October until 9 October 1994. Sixth-seeded Magnus Larsson won the singles title.

Finals

Singles

 Magnus Larsson defeated  Jared Palmer, 6–1, 6–3

Doubles

 Menno Oosting /  Daniel Vacek defeated  Patrick McEnroe /  Jared Palmer, 7–6, 6–7, 6–3

References

External links
 ITF tournament edition details

Grand Prix de Tennis de Toulouse
Grand Prix de Tennis de Toulouse
Grand Prix de Tennis de Toulouse
Grand Prix de Tennis de Toulouse